Barbourofelis is an extinct genus of large, predatory, feliform carnivoran mammals of the family Barbourofelidae (false saber-tooth cats). The genus was endemic to North America and Eurasia during the Miocene until its extinction during the Tortonian, living from 13.6 to 7.3 Ma.

Taxonomy
Barbourofelis was named by Bertrand Schultz, Marian Schultz and Larry Martin (1970) in honor of Erwin Hinckley Barbour, who died a few days before the holotype was discovered. Its type is Barbourofelis fricki and is the type genus of the subfamily Barbourofelinae. It was reassigned to Hoplophoneinae by Flynn and Galiano (1982), then to Barbourofelidae by Bryant (1991), and to Nimravidae by Schultz, et al. (1970) and Martin (1998).

Description

 
While the species B. fricki is thought to have been a lion-sized predator, having a weight comparable to an African lion, with limb bones indicating a muscular, robust body, other species in the genus, such as B. morrisi, are believed to have been closer to the size of leopards. Species in this genus had the longest canines of all the barbourofelids, which were also flattened, indicating a high degree of specialization to its diet. These canines had a longitudinal groove on the lateral surface that has been described as a means of allowing blood from a wound they have inflicted to flow away. This groove more likely was an adaptation to make the canines lighter while maintaining their strength. Other notable traits include the presence of a postorbital bar, the presence of a ventrally extended mental process (bony extensions on either side of the lower jaw), and the shortening of the skull behind the orbits. It had a very robust constitution, with B. morrisi intermediate between the size of Sansanosmilus and B. fricki, which is thought to have been a particularly large predator and the lagrest of all barbourofelids. The barbourofelids was probably very stocky in build, resembling a bear-like lion or lion-like bear. Based on its foot structure, species of Barbourofelis might have had a semi-plantigrade walking stance. Barbourofelis fricki also had a very small brain compared to its body size; its brain was similar in size to a bobcat's, indicating it was not as intelligent as later feliformes or true felids. Barbourofelis also had large carnassial teeth, meant for efficiently processing a carcass, indicating it lived in a highly competitive ecosystem or that it was social and would feed in a competitive, frenzied manner in order to eat as much as other members of its family group. Perhaps a combination of both scenarios was possible.

The most extensive selections of bones found for this genus come from B. loveorum and have allowed further inference to the proportions of other members of the genus.

Paleobiology

Growth and development
 
The skeletons of juvenile Barbourofelis have been found, and examination of their skeletons indicates that the cubs would reach near-adult size before their milk sabers would begin to erupt. This indicates that they were dependent on their mother or potential family group until well into their second year. Such a long period of dependence would have likely led to situations in which near-adult cubs would have likely helped to restrain prey while their mother made the kill. Such behavior potentially was a foundation for more extensive social ties in later feliformes and felids.

Paleoecology 
Barbourofelis loveorum's environment in the Love Bone Beds deposits (of Clarendonian Age) was a mixture of grassland, riverine forest, and marshes, in which it would have shared territory with herbivorous animals like the amphibious rhinoceros Teleoceras, the protoceratid Synthetoceras, the camel Aepycamelus, horses like Neohipparion and Nannippus, and carnivores like the machairodont cat Nimravides, the dogs Epicyon and Osteoborus, and the bear Agriotherium. During the following stage, the Hemphillian, Barbourofelis fricki shared territory with the machairodont species Amphimachairodus coloradensis. Both genera of machairodont, as well as the bear Agriotherium and the dogs Epicyon and Osteoborus would have presented competition to the barbourofelid, while any and all of the large animals present were potential prey species.

References

Miocene feliforms
Barbourofelidae
Miocene mammals of North America
Pliocene mammals of North America
Fossil taxa described in 1970
Prehistoric carnivoran genera